The Joseph Holt House and Chapel, located in Breckinridge County, Kentucky southwest of Addison on Kentucky Route 144, was listed on the National Register of Historic Places in 1976.

The John Holt House was built in c. 1850 and has several elements of Italianate style.

References

Churches completed in 1871
Houses completed in 1850
Houses on the National Register of Historic Places in Kentucky
Italianate architecture in Kentucky
National Register of Historic Places in Breckinridge County, Kentucky
1850 establishments in Kentucky
Gothic Revival church buildings in Kentucky
Chapels in the United States
1871 establishments in Kentucky